Svinčany is a municipality and village in Pardubice District in the Pardubice Region of the Czech Republic. It has about 500 inhabitants.

Administrative parts
Villages of Dolní Raškovice and Horní Raškovice are administrative parts of Svinčany.

References

External links

Villages in Pardubice District